Mailer may refer to:

 Mass mailer, a computer worm that spreads itself via e-mail
 Mailer (occupation), an individual employed to handle newspapers from the press to the truck.
 Mailer (surname)
 Padded envelope

See also
 Mail carrier
 E-mailer
 Central Mailer (disambiguation)
 Mailer-Daemon